Anders Midtgaard is a Danish entrepreneur, speaker and artist. He is the co-founder of Hopin Academy in Ghana. Hopin Academy is a for-profit educational organization based in Tamale, Ghana that is open to anyone. Open 24 hours a day, Hopin Academy derives its name from its educational philosophy as a school designed for students to "hop in and hop out," rather than having strictly organized timetable structures. 
Hopin Academy offers courses in writing, design, film and entrepreneurship. Hopin Academy also provides training to NGOs, government organizations, and other schools, such as the Bryn Mawr College and Olive School of Journalism.

Public speaker 

Anders Midtgaard is also a speaker on issues related to learning, idea-generation and creativity. He spoke in Tallinn, Estonia, in January 2014 at the personalitöö konverents held by national business paper Äripäev. The underlining theme in his speaks being that the key to success in both learning and any creative process is to set goals and create a safe space for enthusiasm and playfulness.

Artist 

As a musician, artist and filmmaker, Anders Midtgaard has worked in Denmark, Estonia  and the United States. 
His works was latest picked in the summer of 2015 for an exhibition on Surveillance at the Nave Gallery in Somerville, Massachusetts.

References

Danish businesspeople
Danish artists
Living people
Year of birth missing (living people)
Place of birth missing (living people)